Mandi is a traditional dish that originated from Hadhramaut, Yemen, consisting mainly of meat and rice with a special blend of spices, cooked in a pit underground. It is popular and commonly consumed in most areas of the Arabian Peninsula, and even considered a staple dish in many regions. It is also found in Egypt, the Levant and Turkey.

In Yemen Mandi is popular among the Hadhrami people.  

Mandi was usually made from rice, meat (lamb, camel, goat or chicken), and a mixture of spices called hawaij. 

The main technique that differentiates mandi from other meat dishes is that the meat is cooked in the taboon.

Etymology 
The word "mandi" comes from the Arabic word "nada", meaning "dew", and reflects the moist 'dewy' texture of the meat.

Technique 
Dry wood (traditionally samer or gadha) is placed in the tandoor and burned to generate heat turning the wood into charcoal. 

The meat is then boiled with whole spices until tender, and the spiced stock is then used to cook the basmati rice at the bottom of the tandoor. The meat is suspended inside the tandoor above the rice and without touching the charcoal. After that, the whole tandoor is then closed with clay for up to eight hours.

See also

Kabsa
Biryani
Haneeth
Maqluba
Mansaf
Nasi kebuli
Quzi
Pilaf
Paella
List of rice dishes

References

External links
 How to Make Chicken Mandi with Step-By-Step photos

Yemeni cuisine
Emirati cuisine
Palestinian cuisine
Malaysian cuisine
Indonesian cuisine
Rice dishes
Arab cuisine